Robin Megraw (born 9 August 1950) is a Canadian former soccer player who competed at the 1976 Summer Olympics.

Career  
In 1966, Megraw played with Oshawa Imperials for three seasons. In 1970, he played in the National Soccer League with Toronto Ukrainians, and later with Toronto City. In 1973, he moved to Toronto First Portuguese of the NSL. In 1977, he played in the North American Soccer League with Toronto Metros-Croatia, and later with Toronto Blizzard. During his tenure with the Blizzards he sustained an injury which shortened his career, and subsequently managed the Oshawa Kicks. 

In 1991, he was inducted into the Oshawa Sports Hall of Fame.

International career  
Megraw represented Canada at the 1975 Pan American Games and the 1976 Summer Olympics.

References

External links
 

1950 births
Living people
Footballers from Liverpool
English emigrants to Canada
Canadian soccer players
Olympic soccer players of Canada
Footballers at the 1976 Summer Olympics
Pan American Games competitors for Canada
Footballers at the 1975 Pan American Games
Toronto Blizzard (1971–1984) players
Canadian National Soccer League players
North American Soccer League (1968–1984) players
Association football defenders
Toronto Ukrainians players
Toronto First Portuguese players